"Drunk and Incapable" is the debut single by from Jamaican dancehall artist Krishane featuring vocals from British singer Melissa Steel. It was released as a digital download on 12 October 2014 in the United Kingdom. The song peaked to number 27 on the UK Singles Chart. There's also a "Simlish" version of the song for The Sims 4's first expansion pack The Sims 4: Get to Work.

Music video
A music video to accompany the release of "Drunk and Incapable" was first released onto YouTube on 19 September 2014 at a total length of three minutes and forty-two seconds.

Track listing

Charts

Release history

References

2014 singles
2014 songs
Atlantic Records singles
Melissa Steel songs
Songs written by Jin Jin (musician)